Cellular memory can refer to:

Biology
Body memory, the hypothesis that (traumatic) memories can be stored in individual cells outside the brain
Neuronal memory allocation, the storage of memories in the brain at the cellular level
The epigenetic state of a cell, including the nongenetic information that can be passed from parents to offspring
Genomic imprinting
Other forms of cellular memory such as immunological memory

Technology
A memory card used in cellphones

See also
Genetic memory (disambiguation)